Onuphe Peltier (November 13, 1821 – May 10, 1880) was an entrepreneur and political figure in Quebec. He represented L'Assomption in the Legislative Assembly of Quebec from 1871 to 1880 as a Conservative.

He was born in Saint-Pierre, Lower Canada, the son of Jean-Baptiste Peltier and Charlotte Cadot. He was educated at L'Assomption and established himself in business at L'Épiphanie. In 1842, he married Marie-Angèle Magnan. Peltier was mayor of L'Épiphanie from 1863 to 1869. He died in office there at the age of 58.

References
 

1821 births
1880 deaths
Conservative Party of Quebec MNAs
Mayors of places in Quebec